Peristoreus viridipennis is a species of true weevil. It is endemic to New Zealand. It is associated with plants of the genus Muehlenbeckia.

P. viridipennis was originally named Erirhinus viridipennis by Broun in 1880. Then, in 1926, Marshall described a new genus called Dorytomodes, into which he provisionally transferred all species placed by Broun in Erirrhinus [=Erirhinus]. Dorytomodes was subsequently sunk as a synonym of Peristoreus by Edwin S. ("Ted") Gourlay in 1950.

References

External links
 Observations from citizen scientists in New Zealand recorded via NatureWatch NZ

Beetles of New Zealand
Curculioninae
Endemic fauna of New Zealand
Beetles described in 1880
Endemic insects of New Zealand